Thitarodes arizanus is a species of moth of the family Hepialidae. It was described by Shōnen Matsumura in 1931 and is endemic to Taiwan.

References

External links
"Hepialidae of the World - List of Genera and Links to Species". Buffalo Museum of Science. Archived from the original October 10, 2007.

Hepialidae
Moths described in 1931
Moths of Taiwan
Endemic fauna of Taiwan